Acid rain is rain or any other form of precipitation that is unusually acidic.

Acid Rain may also refer to:

Music

Albums
Acid Rain (album), a 2002 album by Esham

Songs
"Acid Rain" (Alexis Jordan song), 2013
"Acid Rain" (Angra song), 2001
"Acid Rain", by Avenged Sevenfold on their album Hail to the King
"Acid Rain", by Chance the Rapper on his album Acid Rap
"Acid Rain", by D.R.I. on their album Definition
"Acid Rain", by FireHouse on their album Category 5
"Acid Rain", by Liquid Tension Experiment on their 1999 album Liquid Tension Experiment 2
"Acid Rain", by Lorn